Vasilije Đurić (born 10 July 1998) is a Serbian football midfielder who plays for Radnički Kragujevac.

References

External links
 

1998 births
Sportspeople from Subotica
Living people
Serbian footballers
Association football midfielders
OFK Beograd players
FK Sinđelić Beograd players
FK TSC Bačka Topola players
FK Inđija players
FK Metalac Gornji Milanovac players
Serbian SuperLiga players
Serbian First League players